This is a list of diplomatic missions of Tunisia, excluding honorary consulates.

Africa

 Algiers (Embassy)
 Annaba (Consulate-General)
 Tébessa (Consulate)

 Yaoundé (Embassy)

 Kinshasa (Embassy)

 Cairo (Embassy)

 Addis Ababa (Embassy)

 Abidjan (Embassy)

Nairobi (Embassy)

 Tripoli (Embassy)
 Benghazi (Consulate-General)

 Bamako (Embassy)

 Nouakchott (Embassy)

 Rabat (Embassy)

 Abuja (Embassy)

 Dakar (Embassy)

 Pretoria (Embassy)

 Khartoum (Embassy)

Americas

 Buenos Aires (Embassy)

 Brasília (Embassy)

 Ottawa (Embassy)
 Montreal (Consulate)

 Washington, D.C. (Embassy)

Asia

 Manama (Embassy)

 Beijing (Embassy)

 New Delhi (Embassy)

 Jakarta (Embassy)

 Tehran (Embassy)

 Baghdad (Embassy)

 Tokyo (Embassy)

 Amman (Embassy)

 Kuwait City (Embassy)

 Beirut (Embassy)

 Muscat (Embassy)

 Islamabad (Embassy)

Ramallah (Representative office)
Gaza (Representative office)

 Doha (Embassy)

 Riyadh (Embassy)
 Jeddah (Consulate-General)

 Seoul (Embassy)

 Damascus (Liaison office)

 Ankara (Embassy)
 Istanbul (Consulate)

 Abu Dhabi (Embassy)

 Sanaa (Embassy)

Europe

 Vienna (Embassy)

 Brussels (Embassy)

 Prague (Embassy)

 Helsinki (Embassy)

 Paris (Embassy)
 Lyon (Consulate-General)
 Marseille (Consulate-General)
 Grenoble (Consulate)
 Nice (Consulate)
 Pantin (Consulate)
 Strasbourg (Consulate)
 Toulouse (Consulate)

 Berlin (Embassy)
 Bonn (Consulate General)
 Hamburg (Consulate)
 Munich (Consulate)

 Athens (Embassy)

 Budapest (Embassy)

 Rome (Embassy)
 Palermo (Consulate-General)
 Genoa (Consulate)
 Milan (Consulate)
 Naples (Consulate)

 Valletta (Embassy)

 The Hague (Embassy)

 Oslo (Embassy)

 Warsaw (Embassy)

 Lisbon (Embassy)

 Bucharest (Embassy)

 Moscow (Embassy)

 Belgrade (Embassy)

 Madrid (Embassy)

 Stockholm (Embassy)

 Bern (Embassy)

 London (Embassy)

Multilateral organisations
  African Union
 Addis Ababa (Permanent Mission to the African Union)
 
 Brussels (Permanent Mission to the European Union)
 
 Cairo (Permanent Mission to the Arab League)
 
 Geneva (Permanent Mission to the United Nations and other international organizations)
 New York (Permanent Delegation to the United Nations)

Gallery

See also

 Foreign relations of Tunisia

References

Ministry of Foreign Affairs of Tunisia

Tunisia
Diplomatic missions